John Sidney Linnell (born June 12, 1959) is an American musician, known primarily as one half of the Brooklyn-based alternative rock band They Might Be Giants with John Flansburgh, which was formed in 1982. In addition to singing and songwriting, he plays accordion, baritone and bass saxophone, clarinet, and keyboards for the group.

Linnell's lyrics include strange subject matter and word play. Persistent themes include aging, delusional behavior, bad relationships, death, and the personification of inanimate objects.  Conversely to some of these dark themes, the accompanying melodies are usually cascading and upbeat.

Early life
John Linnell was born in New York City, to father Zenos Linnell, (1925-2011), a psychiatrist, and mother Kathleen (née Glenn; 1936-2008). When Linnell was a child, Walt Kelly's Songs of the Pogo album made a strong impression on his musical sensibilities. The album contained lyrics that relied heavily on puns and word play, which Linnell appreciated. In particular, he recalls "Lines Upon a Tranquil Brow", which later became part of They Might Be Giants's live repertoire. At an early age, Linnell and his family relocated to Lincoln, Massachusetts, where he attended Lincoln-Sudbury Regional High School. Here, he worked on the school newspaper, the Promethean, and met John Flansburgh. The two occasionally collaborated on home-recording projects.

Linnell studied English for a semester at the University of Massachusetts Amherst before dropping out to pursue a career in music.

Musical career

Early work
In high school, Linnell played with a band called The Baggs. Prior to finding success in the alternative rock scene, Linnell was also involved with The Mundanes, a Rhode Island-based new wave band. Linnell played keyboards and saxophone for the group. Because of his unsatisfactory minor role in the band, and under the pressure of The Mundanes' unsuccessful search for a record deal, Linnell began leisurely recording music with John Flansburgh. His family did not support the transition from what they considered to be a more professional band to an experimental one.

1982–present: They Might Be Giants

Linnell co-founded They Might Be Giants in 1982 with high school friend John Flansburgh. While the two split singing and songwriting duties roughly in half, Linnell's songs enjoyed the most commercial success in their early years: singles like "Don't Let's Start" and "Ana Ng" introduced the band to college radio, and they made waves on the Billboard charts in 1990 with "Birdhouse in Your Soul". John Linnell generally writes songs, sings, plays accordion, keyboards, and various woodwind instruments for the band.

Linnell described his role in the group during an interview for Splatter Effect in 1994:

In December 2005, the band began to produce a twice-monthly podcast. Early on, Linnell frequently contributed humorous spoken-word pieces to the program.

1994–2021: Solo work
Since 1994, Linnell has done some solo work: in that year he released the State Songs EP, which he expanded to a full-length album in 1999. The concept of the State Songs project is intentionally misleading: U.S. states feature prominently in the title and chorus of each song, but have very little to do with their actual narratives. "Montana", for instance, is about the insane ramblings of somebody who is about to die; "Idaho" explores a famous rock story in which John Lennon, having consumed hallucinogenic drugs, believed he could drive his house; "South Carolina" is about getting rich as a result of a bicycle accident.

Other side-projects include the limited-release House of Mayors EP in 1996 through the Hello CD of the Month Club and in 1997 a flexi disc of the song "Olive the Other Reindeer" accompanying promotional copies of the children's books, Olive, the Other Reindeer. Linnell has also appeared as a guest musician—often as an accordionist—on a number of musical efforts by other artists, including Suzanne Vega's Days of Open Hand and David Byrne's Grown Backwards.

Linnell provided the singing voice for the Other Father character in the 2009 film Coraline, for which They Might Be Giants wrote the "Other Father Song", included on the film's soundtrack.

On July 2, 2021, Linnell released a four song EP containing original songs sung entirely in Latin, titled "Roman Songs".

Personal life
John Linnell is married to Karen Brown and has one son, Henry, who appeared as a performer on They Might Be Giants' children's albums Here Come the ABCs and Here Come the 123s, as well as his father's solo album Roman Songs.

People magazine poll
In a People magazine online poll—"The Most Beautiful People of 1998"—John Linnell finished ninth (with 4,189 votes, eight ahead of Sarah Michelle Gellar, and 1,038 behind Madonna). He responded to the curious poll results with an op-ed piece in The New York Times:

He went on to say, of online voting:

References

External links

 
 John Linnell – Article on This Might Be a Wiki
 

1959 births
American accordionists
American rock keyboardists
American male singers
American rock saxophonists
American male saxophonists
Bass clarinetists
Grammy Award winners
Living people
Melodica players
People from Lincoln, Massachusetts
Singers from Massachusetts
Songwriters from New York (state)
They Might Be Giants members
Zoë Records artists
21st-century American keyboardists
21st-century American saxophonists
21st-century accordionists
21st-century clarinetists
Lincoln-Sudbury Regional High School alumni
20th-century American keyboardists